Heritage Film Project is a film-production studio and film distribution company established in Charlottesville since 2010. It was founded by Eduardo Montes-Bradley and Soledad Liendo in 2008.

Heritage Film Project produces documentaries on the arts, science and the humanities with a variety of academic and institutional partners. Recent titles include Julian Bond: Reflections from the Frontlines of the Civil Rights Movement, Rita Dove: An American Poet, and White: A Season in the Life of John Borden Evans.

Their lineup of documentary films includes  The University of Virginia Collection, Biographies, and The Latin American Collection. Heritage Film Project documentaries are mainly distributed through Kanopy, and Alexander Street Press, also available from "Filmakers Library", Vimeo on Demand, and Amazon. Heritage Film Project also produces documentaries and photographic work on demand for organizations such as James Madison's Montpelier, UNESCO and a select number of individuals.

University of Virginia collection
 
Heritage Film Project has produced films and a photographic archive on the life of research and faculty members at the University of Virginia. These films have enjoyed a variety of distribution channels and the images produced have been included in the permanent collection of the Claude Moore Health Science Library at and the other archive resources. The collection of films includes interviews with, Teresa A. Sullivan, Jared Loewenstein, Julian Bond, Larry Sabato, Raul Baragiola, Rita Dove, and others. Many of the biographical-sketches resulting from these interviews have premiered on PBS affiliates such as WHTJ, are available throughout social media while public performance rights are licensed through Alexander Street Press. In association with the Curry School of Education and the Brown College, Heritage Film Project was awarded  by the Jefferson Trust to produce Monroe Hill, a one-hour documentary on the life of James Monroe during the period in which he occupied his first farm in Albemarle County.

Selected Titles
 Buscando a Tabernero
 Alice
 Monroe Hill
 Unearthed and Understood
 Rita Dove: An American Poet
 Julian Bond: Reflections from the Frontlines of the Civil Rights Movement
 Loewenstein. Portrait of Jared Lowenstein, University of Virginia librarian. Jared Lowenstein was founder and curator of the Jorge Luis Borges Collection at the Special Collections Department at the University of Virginia Library.
 Baragiola. Portrait of on Physicist Raul Baragiola. Raúl Baragiola (1945-2015) was Alice and Guy Wilson Professor of Engineering Physics and Materials Science in the University of Virginia’s School of Engineering and Applied Science.
 The Faculty Portraits. Series of biographical-essays and portraits on research and clinical faculty at the School of Medicine at the University of Virginia. The series was conceived by William D. Steers. Distinguished faculty portrayed in the series include, Jay Y. Gillenwater, Anthony Herndon, Stuart Howards, Tracy Krupski, William D. Steers, Raymond Costabile, Ryan Smith, John Herr, Jeffrey Lysiak, Jared Christophel, Paul Levine, and Sean Corbett.

Biography

Heritage Film Project has produced biographical documentaries on a wide range of subjects, from Holocaust survivors and World War II veterans, to visual artists and institutions. Many of these biographical works started as projects generated by the Heritage Film Project and produced in-house, others have been produced in partnership with individuals and institutions such as Rotary Club, Museo Nacional de Bellas Artes, Aventura Turnberry Jewish Center, University of California Los Angeles, Beth Torah Benny Rok Campus, Ixtatán Foundation, Virginia Film Festival, James Madison's Montpelier, Embassy of Brazil, Washington, D.C.

Heritage Film Project has also produced the biographical portrayals "The Gillenwater Story" based on the life of Jay Y. Gillenwater, "A Soldier's Dream" a film documenting the experiences of Private Milton Feldman at the Battle of the Bulge where he was captured and later transferred to a POW camp where he reminded until being liberated.

Selected Titles
 White: A Season in the Life of John Borden Evans 
 Calzada. A portrayal of Cuban-American artist Humberto Calzada. Filmed on location in Coral Gables, Florida. The theatrical premier was on January 7, 2010, at the Tower Theatre; TV premiere on January 12, 2010, WPBT Channel 2 (PBS).
 Waissman. Portrait of Andrés Waissman. Filmed on Location in Buenos Aires. Premiered on November 23, 2010, on WPBT Channel 2 (PBS). Theatrical premier at MALBA | Museo de Arte Latinoamericano de Buenos Aires.
 Norman Kloker. Portrait of Norman Kloker pioneer of Rotary Club. Produced in association with the Blue Ridge Chapter of the Rotary Club. The film was shot on Location in Charlottesville, Virginia.
 Pérez Celis. Portrait of Latin American master Pérez Celis. Produced in part with an award from the INCAA. Filmed on Location in Little Haiti.
 Child of the Forest. Portrait of Holocaust survivor Yona Bromberg. Filmed on location in Hallandale. On file at the United States Holocaust Museum.Distributed by Alexander Street Press.
 The Harp of Iwo Jima. Portrait of World War II Veteran US Marine William Eckerth. Filmed on location in Hallandale. On file at the United States Holocaust Museum. Produced with the support of the Library of Congress / Veterans Heritage Project. This film narrates the untold story of US Marine W.J Eckerth, who fought in the South Pacific Theatre on the beaches of Guam and Iwo Jima where he witnessed the raising of the American Flag on Mount Suribachi, an event that would later be re-enacted and photograph for posterity by Joe Rosenthal. On February 23, 2009, Eckerth celebrated the 64th anniversary of the raising of the US flag at the Battle of Iwo Jima. He died on 12 February 2012. Distributed by Alexander Street Press and Kanopy.

Latin American Collection

Selected Titles

 Saavedra. Original Title: Saaveedra: Between Berlin & a Place Called Peixoto Biographical-sketch on Brazilian writer Carola Saavedra. Series Writers Made in Brazil.  Premiered October 9, 2013 at Frankfurt International Book Fair. Shot on location in Berlin and Rio de Janeiro.
 Ariana Lisboa. Biographical-sketch on Brazilian writer Adriana Lisboa.Series Writers Made in Brazil. The film explores the life and work of Brazilian novelist Adriana Lisboa, resident of Louisville. Lisboa was filmed in February 2012, on location, in and around Denver and Boulder. Lisboa premiered on WHTJ PBS / WCVE PBS, Virginia, also aired on Rocky Mountain PBS. Italian Avant Premier with Italian subtitles at Festivaletteratura | Mantua, Italy, on September 5, 2014 Heritage Film Project + Writers Made in Brazil, 2012. Produced in part with a grant from the Brazilian Ministry of External Relations | Embassy of Brazil, Washington, D.C.
 Che: Rise and Fall 
 Evita 
 Samba On Your Feet

References

External links
Official Website 
IMDB 
 School of Medicine Home Page
 UVA - Department of Urology YouTube Channel
 Vimeo Album of films produced by  UVA - Department of Urology on Research and Clinical Faculty
 / Facebook Official Site

Documentary films about science
Educational films
Documentary film series
Film production companies of the United States
Mass media companies established in 2008
Documentary film production companies
Articles containing video clips
2008 establishments in Virginia